French contract law is part of the law of obligations found in the Code Civil dealing with contracts.

Notes

See also
English contract law
US contract law
German contract law

French private law
Contract law
Law of obligations